St. Elmo's Fire is a 1985 American coming-of-age film co-written and directed by Joel Schumacher and starring Emilio Estevez, Rob Lowe, Andrew McCarthy, Demi Moore, Judd Nelson, Ally Sheedy, Andie MacDowell and Mare Winningham. It centers on a clique of recent graduates of Washington, D.C.'s Georgetown University, and their adjustment to post-university life and the responsibilities of adulthood. The film is a prominent movie of the Brat Pack genre. It received negative reviews from critics but was a box-office hit, grossing $37.8 million on a $10 million budget.

Plot
Recent Georgetown University graduates Alec, Leslie, Kevin, Jules, and Kirby arrive at the hospital to see if their friends Wendy and Billy are alright after a minor car accident caused by Billy's drunk driving. In the emergency room, Kirby spots medical intern Dale, his college crush, and strikes up a conversation. After Jules posts bail for Billy due to his DUI, the group gathers at their favorite college hangout, St. Elmo's Bar.  

Each character slowly reveals problems in their lives and relationships - Billy, a reluctant father trapped in an unstable marriage, has difficulty adjusting from his frat boy lifestyle, Wendy has a hard time getting over her feelings for Billy and staying independent from her family's business, Leslie is pressured by Alec into marrying him, but she feels they aren't ready and wants to focus on her career first, Kirby obsesses over gaining Dale's affections, Kevin is bitter over love and is struggling at his writing job, Jules is in debt while stressing over paying for her second stepmother who's on her deathbed, and during a private moment with Kevin, Alec confesses he recently had sex with a lingerie saleswoman and believes that marrying Leslie will keep him faithful.

Wendy invites Billy to have dinner with her wealthy family. While hanging out after dinner, Wendy reveals to Billy that she's still a virgin. They make out, and while tugging at her clothes, Billy makes fun of Wendy's girdle. Fed up with being mistreated by Billy, Wendy insists they just remain friends and kicks him out of her family home. 

During a Halloween party at St. Elmo's, Billy is performing with his band, Wendy brings a date set up by her parents to try and move on from Billy, and Jules reveals to Leslie that she is having an affair with her married boss. Billy's wife Felicia arrives at the party with another man, prompting Billy to attack him mid-performance and getting thrown out. Billy and Felicia have a heated argument outside the bar, but quickly reconcile. The next day, Leslie and Wendy confront Jules over her affair, but she reassures them that it will not be a problem.

Kirby takes a job working for Mr. Kim Sung Ho, a wealthy Korean businessman, and invites Dale to a party that he's holding at Mr. Kim's mansion. When Dale doesn't arrive, Kirby leaves to try and find her. In the middle of the party, Alec announces that he and Leslie are engaged. Upset over the sudden announcement, Leslie confronts Alec and asks him about his infidelity, leading Alec to attack Kevin, accusing him of telling Leslie about his affair. Leslie defends Kevin, telling Alec that he never told her anything and that she had a hunch, causing Alec to break up with her. After the party, Jules gives Billy a ride home and he makes a pass at her. They make out for a bit, but Jules stops, wanting to talk about her problems. When Billy ignores her and continues his sexual advances, Jules angrily kicks him out of her car as Felicia witnesses the confrontation.

Leslie goes to Kevin and Kirby's apartment to spend the night after the break up. The two of them drink and Kevin drunkenly confesses that he has always been in love with Leslie, and they end up having sex. Alec visits the apartment the next day to apologize to Kevin and talk about the break up, but finds out that Leslie and Kevin slept together, and angrily walks out.

Kirby ends up at a ski lodge where Dale is staying with her boyfriend. He tries to leave, but is invited inside the cabin when the car he brought gets stuck in the snow. The next morning, as Kirby prepares to leave, Dale tells him that she is flattered by his interest in her. He kisses her and she watches as Kirby drives off. 

Leslie visits Alec at his job asking for his help in dealing with Jules. She tells him that Jules has been fired from her job and has been unemployed for three weeks, her affair with her boss is over, that she has fallen behind on her credit card payments, and her possessions have been seized. Jules locks herself in her apartment and opens the windows, intending to freeze to death. Her friends attempt to coax her out, but she is unresponsive. Kirby fetches Billy, hoping he'll be able to break in the apartment. Billy convinces Jules to let him in, and the two share a very tender moment, talking about the challenges of life and adulthood, as the rest of the group overhears the conversation. 

Billy visits Wendy, who has moved in to her own apartment, and tells her about the incident. Billy also informs her that he has gotten a divorce and is moving to New York to become a musician. Billy asks Wendy for a going away present and they sleep together. At the bus station, the group gathers to say goodbye to Billy. On the walk home, Leslie decides that she should focus on herself first, and Alec and Kevin make up. They end up outside St. Elmo's bar to drink, but decide to meet for Sunday brunch at Houlihan's instead.

Cast

Production

Development
The film was announced in July 1984. It was executive produced by Ned Tanen. Tanen also produced The Breakfast Club and it and St. Elmo's Fire were dubbed "The Little Chills", in reference to the film The Big Chill. "These are both movies that no one has ever seen before," said Tanen.

Casting
According to Schumacher, "a lot of people turned down the script...the head of [one] major studio called its seven-member cast ‘the most loathsome humans he had ever read on the page.’" The producers interviewed "hundreds of people" for the cast, including Anthony Edwards and Lea Thompson.  According to Lauren Shuler Donner, she found Estevez, Nelson, and Sheedy through recommendations from  John Hughes, who had cast them in The Breakfast Club; Schumacher said he had to "push hard" to get the studio to agree to cast the three. Demi Moore had to go to rehab before shooting.

"I think there are people who go to college because it's kind of what's accepted," said Lowe. "I feel unfortunately sometimes it's used as a holding tank, waiting to go into the real world, instead of for education. I think there are people who can go into the marketplace after high school and do well."

"I think I'm probably going to be criticized a lot," said Nelson. "My character is very straight, very conservative, very career-oriented. After Breakfast Club, I think people will say I should have played another street punk. They'll criticize me for not doing what I'm good at, for trying something new."

"It's refreshing to play someone who isn't defined by who her boyfriend is or what her body looks like," said Sheedy.

"I did feel a little like the new kid in class," said Moore.

Filming
Principal photography began early October 1984, just after executive producer Ned Tanen had been appointed as president of Paramount Pictures' motion picture division.

The private Catholic, Jesuit Georgetown University would not permit filming on campus, with their administrators citing questionable content such as premarital sex. As a result, the university seen on film is the public University of Maryland located 10 miles away in College Park, Maryland.

"I loved wearing the clothes," said Moore, "I've always been such a tom boy."

Reception

Critical response
David Denby called Schumacher "brutally untalented" and said that "nobody over the moral age of fifteen" will like the work of the Brat Pack actors in the film:

According to Janet Maslin: 

On Rotten Tomatoes the film has an approval rating of 42%, with 19 positive reviews out of 45. The site's critical consensus reads: "St. Elmo's Fire is almost peak Brat Pack: it's got the cast, the fashion, and the music, but the characters are too frequently unlikable." On Metacritic the film has a weighted average score of 35 out of 100, based on reviews from 15 critics.

Rob Lowe won a Razzie Award for Worst Supporting Actor for his work in this film.

In a 2015 retrospective review, Justin Gerber of Consequence of Sound said that he was "prepared to say it’s the worst movie of all time, with all the necessary stipulations lined up and accounted for," going on to criticize the characters, plot, set, direction, and even score.

Box office
The film opened strongly, earning $6.1 million in its first week.

The film ended up making $37.8 million. It outperformed other box office disappointments from Columbia Pictures that year, including Silverado, The Bride and Perfect.

Soundtrack
It was the first soundtrack written by Canadian composer/producer David Foster. "When I was writing the score to St. Elmo's Fire, I loved it," he said. "But for that month and a half or so that I had to write the songs, it just felt like doing my regular job."

The theme song "St. Elmo's Fire (Man in Motion)" was written by Foster and English musician John Parr, and also performed by Parr. Foster had been impressed by Parr's song  "Naughty Naughty" and invited him to perform the title track. Originally another song was chosen which Parr disliked. "That song sounded like 'Fame II' or 'Flashdance II, said Parr later. "I thought the movie was supposed to have more class than that. It was a regurgitated song and I didn't really want to sing it."

Parr urged Foster to try another song. They wrote it together, "very fast, between 2 and 4 on Friday afternoon," Parr recalled. "We wrote it together, with David sitting at the piano." Schumacher had given Parr rough guidelines for the lyrics. "He wanted a song about determination," Parr recalled. "He wanted a song about kids who are growing up and have to make decisions about what to do with their lives. That's what the movie is about." Schumacher told them not to use "St. Elmo's Fire" in the lyrics but Parr did it regardless. "I thought it fit in the song," he said. "In the movie, St. Elmo's is a bar. But to me St. Elmo's Fire is a magical thing glowing in the sky that holds destiny to someone. It's mystical and sacred. It's where paradise lies, like the end of the rainbow."

Parr was inspired to write the lyrics not by the movie (which he had not seen) but by the Canadian athlete Rick Hansen who, at the time, was traveling around the world via his wheelchair to raise awareness for spinal cord injuries, a trip called the "Man in Motion Tour." The song did not appear on any Parr album until Letter to America was released in July 2011.

The song "Give Her a Little Drop More", which plays during the movie when the characters enter St. Elmo's Bar & Restaurant, was written by British jazz trumpeter John Chilton.

"St. Elmo's Fire (Man in Motion)" hit No. 1 on Billboards Hot 100 chart for two weeks in September 1985, and "Love Theme from St. Elmo's Fire" (the instrumental theme to the movie by David Foster) reached No. 15. Another version of the "Love Theme from St. Elmo's Fire" with lyrics, titled "For Just a Moment", was performed by Amy Holland and Donny Gerrard, and was included as the final song on the soundtrack album.

Charts

Music Video
The music video of "St. Elmo's Fire (Man in Motion)" serves as a mini-sequel to the film, which features all seven of the main cast reuniting and looking sadly through the broken and dirty windows of a run-down and fire-damaged St. Elmo's Bar. The video was directed by Kort Falkenberg III, who devised the concept with the film's director, Joel Schumacher.

Potential adaptation
In August 2009, Sony Pictures Television received a "script commitment with a penalty attached to it" to adapt the film into a television series, which would "use the movie as a takeoff point and as an inspiration as it introduces six new friends: three boys and three girls." Topher Grace and Gordon Kaywin of Sargent Hall Productions proposed the idea to Jamie Tarses; the three of them then recruited Dan Bucatinsky to write the pilot and got Schumacher to agree to the idea. 
In August 2019, it was reported that NBC was developing a television series with Josh Berman attached as writer and executive producer.

References

External links

 
 
 
 
 "Zizek and the 80s Movie Song" by Graham Wolfe

1985 films
1985 romantic drama films
American coming-of-age films
American romantic drama films
Columbia Pictures films
1980s English-language films
Films directed by Joel Schumacher
Films scored by David Foster
Films with screenplays by Joel Schumacher
Films set in universities and colleges
Films set in Washington, D.C.
Films shot in Maryland
Films shot in Washington, D.C.
Golden Raspberry Award winning films
1980s American films